Herpetological society is a commonly used term for a club or organized group of reptile and amphibian enthusiasts. The term is derived from herpetology - the branch of zoology dealing with the study of those organisms.

Herpetological societies are typically non-profit, private organizations in which members pay dues for the benefit of the group. In general they are geographically focused around a specific state, province, or region, but most groups accept members from anywhere in the world.

A few groups devote their endeavors to the most technical and scientific aspects of herpetology as a science, and therefore require academic or professional credentials of their members. However, most clubs are open to the public, having been founded by hobbyists and non-professionals to promote education and conservation while often sharing knowledge related to husbandry and breeding.

Herpetological Societies
American Society of Ichthyologists and Herpetologists
British Herpetological Society
Herpetologists' League
Herpetological Society of Singapore
Madras Crocodile Bank Trust
Philadelphia Herpetological Society
The Society for the Study of Amphibians and Reptiles
International Society for the History and Bibliography of Herpetology

External links to Herpetological Societies around the world

Australia

New South Wales
Australian Herpetological Society founded in 1949
Macarthur Herpetological Society
Frog and Tadpole Study GroupdfjjdZdf of NSW
Hawkesbury Herpetological Society
Illawarra Reptile Society
Orana Herpetological Society

Queensland
The Herpetological Society of Queensland
North Queensland Herpetological Society founded in 2003
Queensland Frog Society Society founded in 1990
Cape York Herpetological Society founded in 1982

Victoria
Amphibian Research Center
Victorian Frog Group
Victorian Herpetological Society

Austria
Austrian Herpetological Society (English and German language pages)

Belgium
Belgian Herpetological Society founded in 2010

Bangladesh
Herpetology Laboratory' Bangladesh founded in 2011

Brazil
Sociedade Brasileira de Herpetologia founded in 1984 (Portuguese language pages)

Canada
Newfoundland & Labrador Herpetological Society founded in 2013

China
Asiatic Herpetological Research Society founded in 1972

Croatia
Croatian Herpetological Society (Croatian language pages)

Czech Republic
Czech Society for Herpetoloculture and Herpetology (Czech and English language pages)
The Czech Herpetological Society (CHS) founded in 1973 (Czech and English language pages)

Estonia
Baltic Herpetological Society founded in 2005 (English language pages)

Europe (General)
Societas Europaea Herpetologica

Finland
Herpetological Society of Finland founded in 1992 (Finnish and English language pages)

France
Herpetological Society of France founded in 1971 (French language pages)

Germany
The German Chelonia Group (German and English language pages)
German Herpetological Society (German language pages)

Greece
Greek Herpetological Society (Greek and English language pages)

Hong Kong
Hong Kong Society of Herpetology (Chinese and English language pages)

Italy
Societas Herpetologica Italica (Italian herpetological association) founded in 1993(Italian language pages)
Sicilian Herpetological Society founded in 1994 (Italian language pages)

Iran
Pars Herpetologists Institute founded in 2006 (English language pages)

Ireland
The Herpetological Society of Ireland

Japan
Herpetological Society of Japan  founded in 1962 (Japanese and English language pages)

Malaysia
Amphibian and Reptiles of Peninsular Malaysia (English and Malay language pages)

Netherlands
Lacerta - The Netherlands Association for Herpetoculture (Dutch language pages)

New Zealand
New Zealand Herpetological Society founded in 1969
The Society for Research on Amphibians and Reptiles in New Zealand founded in 1987

Norway
Norwegian Herpetological Association (Norwegian language pages)

Philippines
Herpetological Society of the Philippines founded in 2002

Russia
Nikolsky's Herpetological Society (Russian language pages)

Spain
Spanish Herpetological Society founded in 1984 (Spanish language pages)

Valencian Herpetological Society (SOHEVA) founded in 1981 (Spanish language pages)

Sweden
Swedish Herpetological Association founded in 1971 (Swedish language pages)

Turkey
Turkish Herpetological Society founded in 2002 (Turkish language pages)

United Kingdom
The Amphibian and Reptile Group of North Lancashire founded in 2011
The British Herpetological Society founded in 1947
International Herpetological Society founded in 1969
Gloucestershire Amphibian and Reptile Group founded in 2012
Northern Ireland Herpetological Society
Three Counties Tortoises Society

United States
American Society of Ichthyologists & Herpetologists founded in 1913
Green Iguana Society
The Herpetologists' League founded in 1946
Partners in Reptile and Amphibian Conservation
Society for the Study of Amphibians & Reptiles founded in 1958

Alabama
Alabama Herpetological Society founded in 2005
Auburn Herpetological Society (Auburn University) founded in 1999
Southwest Alabama Herpetological Society founded in 2010

Alaska
The Alaska Herpetological Society (Auburn University) founded in 2012

Arizona
Arizona Herpetological Association
Huachuca Area Herpetological Association
Phoenix Herpetological Society
Tucson Herpetological Society founded in 1987

Arkansas
Arkansas Herpetological Society founded in 2004

California
Bay Area Amphibian & Reptile Society founded in 2000
California Turtle & Tortoise Club founded in 1964
Central Valley Herpetological Society founded in 2011
Humboldt County Herpetological Society founded in 2007
North Bay Herpetological Society founded in 1993
Northern California Herpetological Society
San Diego Herp Society
San Diego Turtle & Tortoise Society
Southwestern Herpetologists Society founded in 1954
Central Coast Herpetological Society founded in 2012

Colorado
Colorado Herpetological Society founded in 1972
The Herpetological Society at CSU (Colorado State University) founded in 2011
Northern Colorado Herpetological Society founded in 2013
Pikes Peak Herp Society founded in 2011

Connecticut
UConn Herpetological Society

Florida
Calusa Herpetological Society founded in 1997.
Central Florida Herpetological Society
Jacksonville Herpetological Society founded in 1987 Specializing in reptile rescues and education.
Miami Herpetological Society
Northwest Florida Herpetological Society founded in 2012
Sandalwood Herpetology Club Sandalwood High School
Sawgrass Herpetological Society
South Florida Herpetological Society
Suncoast Herpetological Society

Georgia
Atlanta Herpetology Club founded in 2006
Georgia Herpetological Society founded in 1968
Georgia Reptile Society
The Orianne Society founded in 2008
Southeastern Hot Herp Society founded in 1998

Idaho
Idaho Herpetological Society

Illinois
Central Illinois Herpetological Society
Chicago Herpetological Society founded in 1968
SIU Herpetology Club (Southern Illinois University) founded in 2013

Iowa
Iowa Herpetological Society founded in 1978

Indiana
Hoosier Herpetological Society
Wabash Valley Herpetological Society
Tri-State Herpetological Society founded in 2010

Kansas
Kansas Herpetological Society founded in 1974

Kentucky
Kentucky Herpetological Society founded in 1998

Louisiana
Louisiana Gulf Coast Herpetological Society

Maine
Maine Herpetological Society

Maryland
Mid-Atlantic Turtle & Tortoise Society founded in 1997

Massachusetts
New England Herpetological Society founded in 1972

Michigan
Michigan Society of Herpetologists

Minnesota
Minnesota Herpetological Society

Missouri
Kansas City Herpetological Society
Missouri Herpetological Association founded in 1987
Southwest Missouri Herpetological Society
St. Louis Herpetological Society founded in 1974

Nebraska
Nebraska Herpetological Society

Nevada
Great Basin Herpetological Society
Southern Nevada Herpetological Society founded in 1993

New Mexico
Rio Grande Turtle & Tortoise Club founded in 1998

New York
Cornell Herpetological Society (Cornell University) founded in 1993
Long Island Herpetological Society founded in 1987
New York Turtle & Tortoise Society
Staten Island Herpetological Society
Upstate Herpetological Association

North Carolina
Lake Norman Herpetological Society
North Carolina Herpetological Society founded in 1978
Southern Appalachian Herpetological Society founded in 2009

North Dakota
Fargo Herpetological Society founded in 2012
Bismarck Herpetological Society

Ohio
Greater Cincinnati Herpetological Society founded in 1977
Toledo Herpetological Society founded in 2012

Oregon
Oregon Herpetological Society
South West Oregon Herpetological Society founded in 2012

Pennsylvania
Lancaster Herpetological Society founded in 2012
Philadelphia Herpetological Society founded in 1952

South Carolina
The Turtle and Tortoise Society of Charleston

Tennessee
Tennessee Herpetological Society founded in 1992

Texas
Austin Herpetological Society
Dallas-Ft. Worth Herpetological Society
East Texas Herpetological Society founded in 1989
Gulf Coast Turtle & Tortoise Society founded in 1994
Houston Herpetological Society founded in 2011
South Texas Herpetology Association
Southwestern Center for Herpetological Research founded in 2007
Texas Herpetological Society founded in 1939
West Texas Herpetological Society

Virginia
Virginia Herpetological Society founded in 1958

Washington
Pacific Northwest Herpetological Society

Wisconsin
University of Wisconsin–Stevens Point Herpetology Society
Madison Area Herpetological Society founded in 2010

Herpetology organizations